The western rock elephant shrew or western rock sengi (Elephantulus rupestris) is a species of elephant shrew in the family Macroscelididae. It is found in Namibia, South Africa, and possibly Angola and Botswana. Its natural habitats are subtropical or tropical dry shrubland and rocky areas.

Smaller members of western rock elephant shrew possess functional brown adipose tissue, which changes in thermogenic capacity depending on the season.

References

Elephant shrews
Mammals described in 1831
Taxonomy articles created by Polbot